Sochchora mulinus is a moth of the family Pterophoridae. It is known from Brazil.

The wingspan is about 10 mm. Adults are on wing in November.

External links

Pterophorinae
Moths described in 2006
Taxa named by Cees Gielis
Moths of South America